The Château de Pibrac is a converted 16th century castle in the commune of Pibrac in the Haute-Garonne département of France.

It was rebuilt in 1540 to replace the old manor house. The architect appears to be Nicolas Bachelier. During the Revolution, in 1794, the sculptures were smashed and the tops of the  towers destroyed. It was restored, with alterations, in 1887.

One of the rooms, known as the Quatrains' cabinet, has vaults decorated with mythological subjects dating from the 16th century. According to tradition, it was in this room, which has kept its 16th century decorations almost intact, that Guy du Faur de Pibrac composed his famous "moral quatrains".

The red brick structure, privately owned, has been listed since 1932 as a monument historique by the French Ministry of Culture.

See also
 List of castles in France
 Renaissance architecture of Toulouse
 Guy Du Faur, Seigneur de Pibrac

References

External links
 

Castles in Haute-Garonne
Châteaux in Haute-Garonne
Monuments historiques of Haute-Garonne